David Kramer (born 27 June 1951) is a South African singer, songwriter, playwright and director,  notable for his musicals about the Cape Coloured communities, and for his early opposition to apartheid.

Early life
Kramer was born in Worcester, South Africa, to a furniture merchant and a hairdresser and spent his formative years in Worcester. His brother, John Kramer, became an artist known for his oil-on-canvas portrayal of cafés, stores, and houses standing in the sharp sunlight of sleepy towns. The family's maiden name was initially Karabelnik; however, it was later changed to Kramer by his grandfather, who arrived in South Africa from Lithuania in 1899 and made a living as a salesman (walking from farm to farm selling goods).

During Kramer's stay in Worcester, he had some music lessons with the classical composer Cromwell Everson. He played in a South African band called The Creeps in the 1960s and then traveled to England in 1971 to study textile design at Leeds University on a bursary.

Musical career

He began his music career in the mid-1970s, singing at folk clubs and campus concerts in South Africa. David pioneered the use of Cape Afrikaans and South African English in his lyrics, often using both languages in the same song. He focused on small-town South Africa and employed gritty realism and dark satire to tell his stories and describe his characters.

In his stage performances, he portrayed himself as a rural everyman who traveled the dusty roads of small-town South Africa with an old bicycle and a cheap guitar. He sang in the Boland patois of his youth, told stories, and sang songs in both languages.

Mountain Records issued his first six albums. The first album BAKGAT!, was released in 1980 and was immediately banned in its entirety by the SABC because it was considered too political and vulgar for the South African ear. Despite initial setbacks, the album received 11 gold and one platinum record for sales.

Kramer's follow-up album, Die Verhaal van Blokkies Joubert, a portrait of a has-been Springbok rugby player, quickly climbed the music charts and made him a household name.

Notable singles from the album were Blokkies Joubert and Die Royal Hotel. Both sat at the top of the charts on various South African Radio stations. The album reached number 11 on the South African LP charts.

His only other singles of notoriety were Stoksielalleen from the Kwaai album; however, he did chart with Delicious Monster, Hanepootpad, and Kwaai on the album's charts. All 6 of his albums released on the Mountain label earned a gold or platinum status.

In 1983, David licensed his idiosyncratic image to Volkswagen South Africa to use on their Microbus (called a "Kombi"). This was the beginning of a television and print campaign that won the hearts of South Africans. The campaign made David Kramer into a household name and was to continue for the next thirteen years - probably the longest-running celebrity endorsement this country has seen. With his trademark red veldskoen shoes, bicycle and guitar, he became a household name as the face of the SA Volkswagen Microbus advertisements.

Kramer and Taliep Petersen first met in the mid-'70s at a folk concert staged by Des and Dawn Lindberg at the University of Cape Town. In 1986 he collaborated with Petersen on the highly acclaimed stage musical District Six, a politically influenced musical telling the story of the people of District Six in Cape Town, South Africa, that were forcibly removed from the area during apartheid. It was produced by the Baxter Theatre and his wife, Renaye Kramer, opened in April 1987.

With Petersen, he created Fairyland, Poison, and Kat & the Kings, all to critical acclaim, the latter having successful runs on Broadway and in London's West End.

His enduring friendship with Taliep led to a working relationship based on mutual respect until Taliep's murder in 2006. As a tribute to his long partnership with Petersen and to honor his memory, a Kramer Petersen Songbook production was staged at the Baxter Theatre and ran to sold-out houses from the first performance.

In December 2007, Kramer was awarded an Honorary Doctorate in Literature (Honoris Causa) by the University of Cape Town.

In 2001, Kramer launched a show called Karoo Kitaar Blues, presenting the eccentric guitar styles of the Karoo - the unique finger-picking and tunings of marginalized people who live in remote villages and outposts of the semi-desert areas of South Africa. The show's quasi-documentary aimed to tell the story and document a long forgotten and almost lost part of South Africa's musical heritage and features unknown musicians and instruments from the Northern Cape hinterland.

As a direct result, one of these "forgotten" artists, Hannes Coetzee, became an overnight YouTube sensation, and was invited to participate in a teaching workshop for Slide and Steel Guitar in Port Townsend, WA.

David Kramer has been an enduring figure in South Africa's music scene. His most recent works are songs that tell stories about ordinary life in South Africa.

Albums 
 Bakgat! (1980)
 Die Verhaal van Blokkies Joubert (1981)
 Delicious Monster (1982)
 Hanepootpad (1983)
 Jis Jis Jis (1983)
 Kwaai (1984)
 Van Der Merwe P.I. (1985) (Soundtrack to a movie of the same name)
 Laat vir die Dans (1986)
 Baboondogs (1986)
 Cape Town (1988)
 Eina (1989)
 Klassic Kramer (compilation) (1996)
 Alles Vannie Beste (1997)
 Kliphard (2001)
 Karoo Kitaar Blues (2002)
 Huistoe (2004)
 Hemel en Aarde (2007)
 Wakkerslaap (2017)
 Sharttendorrf (2019)

Musicals 
 District Six (1986)
 Fairyland (1991)
 Poison (1992)
 Crooners (1992)
 Klop Klop (1996)
 Kat and the Kings (1995)
 Die Ballade van Koos Sas (2001)
 Ghoema (2005)
 The Kramer Petersen Songbook (2007)
 David Kramer's Breyani (2010)
 Some Like It Vrot (2011)
 Blood Brothers (2013)
 Orpheus in Africa (2015)
 Langarm(2018)
 Danger in the Dark (2018)

See also
List of Afrikaans singers
List of South African musicians

References

External links 
 
 David Kramer - Give credit where credit is due.

1951 births
Afrikaans-language singers
Living people
South African male composers
20th-century South African male singers
South African dramatists and playwrights
South African singer-songwriters
21st-century South African male singers
People from Worcester, South Africa
Alumni of the University of Leeds